Oncopeltus guttaloides is a species of seed bug in the family Lygaeidae. It is found in the southern Central America and the southern United States. Like other species of Oncopeltus, their nymphs are gregarious and can be found in large clusters on host plants.

Distribution
Oncopeltus guttaloides is found in the southern US, Cuba, Guatemala, Honduras, Jamaica, Mexico, and Santo Domingo

References

Lygaeidae
Insects described in 1964